SCH or Sch may refer to:
  A Scholar of Trinity College, Dublin
 Sch (trigraph), the German letter for 'sh' as in 'fish'
 Schizophrenia, a psychiatric diagnosis
 SCH Synchronization Channel, a GSM Um radio interface channel
 Schutzhund, a dog sport
 Schedule, in systems of pipe sizes
 Succinylcholine, a neuromuscular blocking drug
 Sch. (Scheinergrade aka Degree Scheiner), an obsolete scale for measuring film speeds established by Julius Scheiner
 .sch (file extension), used for circuit diagram files by several design automation programs
 .sch, a second-level domain
 Sub-Conjunctival hemorrhage

Music
 SCH (band), an Industrial rock band from Sarajevo
 SCH (album), their 1987 self-titled album
 Sch (rapper), a French rapper

Abbreviations
 Sydney Congress Hall, a Salvation Army Corps in Sydney, Australia
 Schenectady County Airport, a public airport in Schenectady County, New York
 Singular cardinals hypothesis, a concept in set theory
 Specialist Computer Holdings, parent company of SCC
 Sub-conjunctival haemorrhage
 St. Cloud Hospital, an American hospital in St. Cloud, Minnesota
 Space Center Houston, the official visitors center of Lyndon B. Johnson Space Center
 Santander Central Hispano, formerly a brand name of Banco Santander Central Hispano, now Banco Santander
 Sydney Children's Hospital, a children's hospital in the Eastern Suburbs of Sydney, New South Wales, Australia
 System Controller Hub, an Intel chipset component
 Soonchunhyang University, a private university in South Korea